Şanlıurfa S.K. is a Turkish sports club located in Şanlıurfa. The football team currently plays in the TFF Second League.

Current squad

Out on loan

References

External links
Official website
Şanlıurfaspor on TFF.org

 
Sport in Şanlıurfa
Football clubs in Turkey
Association football clubs established in 1969
1969 establishments in Turkey